Margarete Depner (née, Margarete Scherg; 22 March 1885 - 2 September 1970) was a Romanian sculptor, painter and illustrator of Transylvanian Saxon ancestry. Born in Braşov in 1885, she died in 1970 in the same city. In 1931, she studied at the Berlin studio of Josef Thorak.

References

External links

1885 births
1970 deaths
Romanian illustrators
Romanian women sculptors
Romanian women illustrators
People from Brașov
Transylvanian Saxon people
20th-century Romanian painters
20th-century Romanian sculptors
Romanian women artists
20th-century women artists